Hypochalcia propinquella is a species of snout moth in the genus Hypochalcia. It was described by Eduard Friedrich Eversmann in 1842. It is found in Ukraine, Russia, France, Poland, Switzerland, Austria, Italy, Hungary, Romania and Bulgaria.

Subspecies
Hypochalcia propinquella propinquella (Ukraine, Russia)
Hypochalcia propinquella bruandella (Guenee, 1845) (France, Poland, Switzerland, Austria, Italy, Hungary, Romania)
Hypochalcia propinquella subrubiginella Ragonot, 1887 (Italy, Switzerland, Bulgaria)

References

Moths described in 1845
Phycitini
Moths of Europe